Yeung Chui Ling (born 17 September 1982) is a fencer from Hong Kong, China who won a bronze medal at the 2006 Asian Games in the women's épée team competition.  She also competed at the 2008 Summer Olympics and 2012 Summer Olympics, losing her only bout both times.

References

Living people
1982 births
Hong Kong female épée fencers
Fencers at the 2008 Summer Olympics
Fencers at the 2012 Summer Olympics
Olympic fencers of Hong Kong
Place of birth missing (living people)
Asian Games medalists in fencing
Fencers at the 2002 Asian Games
Fencers at the 2006 Asian Games
Fencers at the 2010 Asian Games
Fencers at the 2014 Asian Games
Asian Games bronze medalists for Hong Kong
Medalists at the 2002 Asian Games
Medalists at the 2006 Asian Games
Medalists at the 2010 Asian Games
Medalists at the 2014 Asian Games
Alumni of Hong Kong Baptist University